Under My Skin is a 2020 Australian-American drama film directed by David O'Donnell, starring Liv Hewson, Alex Russell, Bobbi Salvör Menuez, Lex Ryan and Chloe Freeman.

Cast
 Alex Russell as Ryan
 Liv Hewson as Denny 1
 Chloe Freeman as Denny 2
 Lex Ryan as Denny 3
 Bobbi Salvör Menuez as Denny 4
 Alexis Denisof as Mike
 Michael Ray Escamilla as Collin
 Diana Hopper as Daisy
 James Saivanidis as Garth
 Joseph Lee Anderson as Tallis
 Davida Williams as Dana
 Dominic Russell as Chase
 Jeffrey Doornbos as Townsend
 Mason O'Sullivan as Randall
 Ashwin Gore as Brian

Release
The film premiered at the Raindance Film Festival on 29 October 2020.

Reception
Alan Ng of Film Threat gave the film a score of 8/10, praising the performances of Hewson, Freeman, Ryan and Menuez as well as the film's portrayal of Denny and Ryan's relationship, and called it "utterly captivating".

The Curb called the film a "difficult watch for a number of reasons", but a "valuable and ultimately hopeful one."

Chris Bright of FilmInk wrote that while the film "adheres to many Hollywood romantic cliches", and "a lot of the sub-characters fall to the wayside quickly", the film's story is "unique" and O'Donnell is "certainly breaking new ground".

References

External links
 
 

Australian drama films
American drama films
2020 drama films